The National Library of Senegal (Bibliothèque nationale du Sénégal or Bibliothèque des Archives nationales du Sénégal) is located in Dakar, Senegal.

History
As of 1993, "three libraries perform the functions of a national library" in Senegal: the library of the Archives Nationales (est. 1913), the library of the Institut Fondamental d'Afrique Noire (est. 1938), and the library of the Centre de Recherche et de Documentation (est. 1944). Legal deposit was established in 1976 per decree number 76-493.

See also 
 National Archives of Senegal
 Centre de Recherche et Documentation du Senegal
 List of national libraries

References

Bibliography
  

Libraries in Senegal
Senegal
Dakar
1970s establishments in Senegal